Model Institute of Engineering and Technology (MIET) is a technical institution located in Jammu, Jammu and Kashmir, India. The institution was opened in 1998 and is approved by the All India Council for Technical Education and affiliated with the University of Jammu.

MIET is accredited by the National Assessment and Accreditation Council with "A" Grade (NAAC), while the departments of Electronics, Communications, Computer Science and Engineering were accredited by the National Board of Accreditation (NBA).. MIET is accredited with "A" grade by NAAC and was awarded the "Best Institution award" in 2014 by all north Indian engineering colleges by NITTR. MIET is ranked 51st in the top 100 tech enabled institutions in the recent rankings published by Dataquest.

External links
 
 

Courses offered in MIET Jammu currently
1: Bachelor of engineering
     Civil engineering
     Electric engineering
     E & C  engineering
     CSE engineering 
      IT engineering
2: Master of business administration
3:Master of computer administration
4:Master of engineering
   CSE engineering

References 

Education in Jammu (city)
Universities and colleges in Jammu and Kashmir
Engineering colleges in Jammu and Kashmir